Fusinus aurinodatus is a species of sea snail, a marine gastropod mollusc in the family Fasciolariidae, the spindle snails, the tulip snails and their allies.

Description
The length of the shell attains 161.2 mm.

Distribution
This marine species occurs off Madagascar.

References

 Stahlschmidt P. & Lyons W.G. (2009). Fusinus aurinodatus (Gastropoda: Fasciolariidae) from Somalia and the Mozambique Channel. Miscellanea Malacologica, 3(4): 87-95

aurinodatus
Gastropods described in 2009